13 Rue Madeleine is a 1947 American World War II spy film directed by Henry Hathaway and starring James Cagney, Annabella, Richard Conte and Frank Latimore. Allied volunteers are trained as spies in the leadup to the invasion of Europe, but one of them is a German double agent.

Plot
Bob Sharkey is put in charge of the 77th group of American espionage candidates. However, he is informed by his boss Charles Gibson that one of his students is a German Abwehr agent. He accepts the challenge of identifying him. He correctly chooses "Bill O'Connell". Gibson reveals that O'Connell is actually Wilhelm Kuncel, one of Germany's top spies. He tells Sharkey to pass him through the course, as they know his mission is to determine the date and location of Operation Overlord (the Allied invasion of Europe). They assign him a job in London that gives him full access to false information about "Plan B", the invasion of Germany through the Lowlands, hoping he will pass it along to his superiors.

At the end of their training, three of the new agents—Frenchwoman Suzanne de Beaumont, American Jeff Lassiter, and Kuncel—are sent to Great Britain. There, they prepare to fly into German-occupied territory. Kuncel is given a mission in Holland, supposedly because of his familiarity with the region. Lassiter is assigned to kidnap and bring back to England the French collaborator Duclois. Duclois designed and built the main assembly and supply depot for V-2 rockets that will be used against the key Allied invasion port of Southampton, and what he knows will be vital for achieving its destruction. Suzanne goes along as Lassiter's radio operator. Sharkey tells Lassiter about Kuncel and orders him to kill his friend and former roommate if he thinks Kuncel has not been deceived. However, on the airplane, Lassiter cannot conceal his uneasiness from Kuncel. Kuncel sabotages his parachute, and when the trio are sent to Holland, Lassiter plummets to his death. Gibson and Sharkey realize that Kuncel knows that the information he was given is false.

With no time to brief another agent, Sharkey volunteers to take Lassiter's place. Gibson is reluctant to do so, as Sharkey knows the date and location of the invasion, but finally agrees. With the help of the local French resistance led by the town's mayor, Sharkey takes Duclois prisoner. However, in stopping Kuncel from interfering with the airplane taking off with Duclois, Sharkey is captured. Suzanne is killed while transmitting the news to England. Kuncel takes Sharkey to Gestapo headquarters at 13 Rue Madeleine in Le Havre and supervises his torture when Sharkey refuses to talk. Back in Great Britain, Gibson has no choice but to order a bombing raid to destroy the building before Sharkey cracks. When the bombing starts, Sharkey laughs in triumph in Kuncel's face.

Cast

 James Cagney as Robert Emmett 'Bob' Sharkey
 Annabella as Suzanne de Beaumont
 Richard Conte as Wilhelm Kuncel / William H. 'Bill' O'Connell
 Frank Latimore as Jeff Lassiter
 Walter Abel as Charles Gibson
 Melville Cooper as Pappy Simpson
 Sam Jaffe as Mayor Galimard
 Trevor Bardette as Resistance fighter (uncredited)
 Red Buttons as Second Jump Master (uncredited)
 Arno Frey as German Officer (uncredited)
 Karl Malden as B-24 Jumpmaster (uncredited)
 E. G. Marshall as Emile (uncredited)
 Donald Randolph as La Roche (uncredited)
 Roland Winters as Van Duyval (uncredited)
 Blanche Yurka as Madame Thillot (uncredited)

Production
Prohibited from mentioning the OSS during the war due to secrecy, several Hollywood studios made their own films about the agency after the war, such as Paramount's O.S.S., Warner Bros./United States Pictures Cloak and Dagger, and RKO's Notorious directed by Alfred Hitchcock. Though 13 Rue Madeleine was originally written to showcase the O.S.S., with Cagney playing a character based on William Donovan and featuring Peter Ortiz as a technical advisor, Donovan raised major objections to the film, including the idea that his agency had been infiltrated by an enemy agent.  The spy group was renamed "O77" and Cagney's character had no similarities to Donovan.

The film followed Fox's The House on 92nd Street, a true story of Federal Bureau of Investigation counter espionage, which shared the same director, producer, and one of the writers.

Much of the filming was done in Quebec City, Quebec, Canada. The scene where Sharkey is leaving the "local French HQ" on his way to meet with the local resistance was shot on rue Donnacona, with the Ursulines School in the background.

The Breen Office objected to the Americans bombing a building solely to kill Sharkey. But Sy Bartlett, one of the film's scriptwriters, had been in the Army Air Corps during World War II and such an incident did take place, though in a different context. According to Henry Hathaway, the film's director, that actual occurrence was the basis for the film's final scene.

References

External links
 
 
 
 
 

1947 films
1940s spy drama films
20th Century Fox films
American black-and-white films
American spy drama films
1940s English-language films
Films about the French Resistance
Films directed by Henry Hathaway
Films scored by David Buttolph
Operation Overlord films
Office of Strategic Services in fiction
World War II spy films
1947 drama films
Films set in London
1940s American films